Yunost Stadium (or Zhastar Stadium in Kazakh:) is a sports stadium in Oral, Kazakhstan. The stadium is used for the home games of bandy team Akzhayik Sports Club. Starting in the 2017–18 season, the stadium was supposed to have an artificial ice surface. It got delayed but in 2018 it was officially ready for use.

References

Bandy venues in Kazakhstan
Sport in Oral, Kazakhstan